The Tobacco War (1780–1781) occurred during the American Revolutionary War in Virginia when the British forces commanded by generals Cornwallis, Phillips, and Arnold, burned the colonists' tobacco. About 10,000 hogsheads of cured tobacco leaf were destroyed by the British. The British wanted to win in the southern colonies by causing steep economic losses. They also wished to entirely disrupt the tobacco industry because the colonists used the tobacco trade to fund their war effort against Britain. This complemented existing efforts by the British Royal Navy to seize shipments of tobacco leaving American ports.

General Benedict Arnold attempted to bargain with the colonists for their tobacco. Once in Richmond, Virginia in January 1781, Benedict Arnold wrote a letter to Virginia governor Thomas Jefferson, asking him to surrender the city's tobacco supplies in exchange for British forces not destroying the city. Jefferson did not negotiate with Arnolds or turn over the tobacco. The troops led by Phillips burned about 8,000 hogsheads of tobacco in Petersburg, Manchester, Blandford, and Osborne. In addition to burning the colonists' curing barns and tobacco fields, British forces also freed the enslaved people held by the colonists. Some of the scorched tobacco fields and thirty of the enslaved people freed belonged to Thomas Jefferson, who wrote that it was a "useless and barbarous injury". The Tobacco War represented the "last gasp of a floundering army", and did not significantly impact the trajectory of the Revolutionary War.

See also 

 Action at Osborne's
 Black Patch Tobacco Wars
 Southern theater of the American Revolutionary War

References 

Virginia in the American Revolution
Tobacco in the United States
History of Virginia